The Patty Berg Classic was a golf tournament on the LPGA Tour, played in 1969 at Pleasant Valley Country Club in Sutton, Massachusetts, United States. Kathy Whitworth won the event by one stroke over Sandra Haynie.

See also
Patty Berg Classic - an unrelated LPGA Tour event played in Minnesota from 1975 to 1980.

References

1969 in women's golf
1969 in sports in Massachusetts
Former LPGA Tour events
Golf in Massachusetts
History of Worcester County, Massachusetts
Sports competitions in Massachusetts
Sports in Worcester County, Massachusetts
Sutton, Massachusetts
Tourist attractions in Worcester County, Massachusetts
History of women in Massachusetts